|}

The Coronation Stakes is a Group 1 flat horse race in Great Britain open to three-year-old fillies. It is run at Ascot over a distance of 7 furlong and 213 yards (1,603 metres), and it is scheduled to take place each year in June.

History
The event was established in 1840, and its title commemorates the coronation of a new British monarch, Queen Victoria, two years earlier.

The present system of race grading was introduced in 1971, and for a period the Coronation Stakes held Group 2 status. It was promoted to Group 1 level in 1988.

The Coronation Stakes is now contested on the fourth day of the five-day Royal Ascot meeting. It usually features fillies which ran previously in the 1,000 Guineas, the Poule d'Essai des Pouliches or the Irish 1,000 Guineas. The most recent filly to follow up a win in one of those races with victory in the Coronation Stakes was Alpha Centauri, the 2018 Irish 1,000 Guineas winner.

Records
Leading jockey (5 wins):
 Nat Flatman – The Princess (1844), Stitch (1845), Distaffina (1848), Lady Evelyn (1849), Barcelona (1851)
 Morny Cannon – Lady Hermit (1892), Silene (1893), Throstle (1894), Helm (1896), Lowood (1898)

Leading trainer (6 wins):
 John Porter – Lovely (1883), Sandiway (1884), Cereza (1891), Throstle (1894), Helm (1896), Lowood (1898)

Leading owner (7 wins):
 Waldorf Astor, 2nd Viscount Astor – Winkipop (1910), Pogrom (1922), Saucy Sue (1925), Book Law (1927), Sunny Devon (1931), Betty (1933), Traffic Light (1936)

Winners since 1951

Earlier winners

 1840: Spangle
 1841: Ghuznee
 1842: Celia
 1843: La Stimata
 1844: The Princess
 1845: Stitch
 1846: Guaracha
 1847: Cosachia
 1848: Distaffina
 1849: Lady Evelyn
 1850: filly by Slane
 1851: Barcelona
 1852: Iona
 1853: Catherine Hayes
 1854: Mishap
 1855: Alcyone
 1856: Victoria
 1857: Beechnut
 1858: Sunbeam
 1859: Cantine
 1860: Allington
 1861: Queen of the Vale
 1862: Polynesia
 1863: Lady Augusta
 1864: Breeze
 1865: Siberia
 1866: Mother of Pearl
 1867: Achievement
 1868: Athena
 1869: Martinique
 1870: Sunshine
 1871: Corisande
 1872: Highland Lassie
 1873: Marie Stuart
 1874: Apology
 1875: Maud Victoria
 1876: Footstep
 1877: Belphoebe
 1878: Redwing
 1879: Lelia
 1880: L'Eclair
 1881: Mazurka
 1882: Rozelle
 1883: Lovely
 1884: Sandiway
 1885: St Helena
 1886: Argo Navis
 1887: Heloise
 1888: Seabreeze
 1889: Seclusion
 1890: Heresy
 1891: Cereza
 1892: Lady Hermit
 1893: Silene
 1894: Throstle
 1895: Butterfly
 1896: Helm
 1897: Goletta
 1898: Lowood
 1899: Fascination
 1900: Sainte Nitouche / Winifreda *
 1901: Bella Gallina
 1902: Doctrine
 1903: Oriole
 1904: Pretty Polly
 1905: Commune
 1906: Keystone
 1907: Frugality
 1908: Lesbia
 1909: Princesse de Galles
 1910: Winkipop
 1911: Knockfeerna
 1912: Polkerris
 1913: Prue
 1914: Wassilissa
 1915–18: no race
 1919: Flying Spear
 1920: Cinna
 1921: Donna Branca
 1922: Pogrom
 1923: Paola
 1924: Straitlace
 1925: Saucy Sue
 1926: Moti Mahal
 1927: Book Law
 1928: Toboggan
 1929: Daumont
 1930: Qurrat-al-Ain
 1931: Sunny Devon
 1932: Udaipur
 1933: Betty
 1934: Foxcroft
 1935: Ankaret
 1936: Traffic Light
 1937: Gainsborough Lass
 1938: Solar Flower
 1939: Olein
 1940–45: no race
 1946: Neolight
 1947: Saucy Sal
 1948: Fortuity
 1949: Avila
 1950: Tambara

* The 1900 race was a dead-heat and has joint winners.

See also
 Horse racing in Great Britain
 List of British flat horse races

References
 Paris-Turf:
 Racing Post:

 galopp-sieger.de – Coronation Stakes.
 horseracingintfed.com – International Federation of Horseracing Authorities – Coronation Stakes (2018).
 pedigreequery.com – Coronation Stakes – Ascot.
 
 Race Recordings 

Flat races in Great Britain
Ascot Racecourse
Flat horse races for three-year-old fillies
Recurring sporting events established in 1840
British Champions Series
1840 establishments in England